Zou Yucheng (born 15 September 1991) is a Chinese footballer who plays as a midfielder.

Club career
Zou Yucheng would play for Beijing Guoan's youth academy before he was sent to the club's satellite team Beijing Guoan Talent Singapore FC who were allowed to play as a foreign team in Singapore's S. League in the 2010 season. He would make his debut in a Singapore League Cup game on 23 February 2010 against Sengkang Punggol in a 3-1 defeat in extra time. At the end of the season he was allowed to leave the club and he joined third tier football club Chongqing where in his debut season he was able to gain promotion with the club in his first campaign. After three seasons with the club they were relegated at the end of the 2013 China League One campaign and disbanded. Zou would join third tier football club Yinchuan Helanshan on a free transfer for the 2014 China League Two campaign. He would move to Inner Mongolia Zhongyou where he would establish himself as an integral member of their team before joining Zhejiang Greentown on 31 January 2019. He would make his debut in a league game on 17 March 2019 against Heilongjiang Lava Spring in a 2-1 victory. Often used as a squad player, he would still be part of the team gained promotion to the top tier at the end of the 2021 campaign.

Career statistics

References

External links

1991 births
Living people
Chinese footballers
Association football midfielders
Singapore Premier League players
China League One players
Inner Mongolia Zhongyou F.C. players
Zhejiang Professional F.C. players
21st-century Chinese people